Lecithocera punctigeneralis is a moth in the family Lecithoceridae. It was described by Francis Walker in 1864. It is found on Borneo.

Adults are chalybeous (steel-blue) brown, the wings with a fawn-coloured band and the forewings with two dark cupreous-brown testaceous-bordered bands. The first band is abbreviated in front, dilated hindward, broader than the second, which is marginal. There are also two dark brown testaceous-bordered points on the outer side of the first band. The costa is mostly testaceous, with a dark brown mark in front of the first band.

References

Moths described in 1864
punctigeneralis